Stanley Wood may refer to:

 Stan Wood (1905–1967), English footballer
 Stanley L. Wood (1866–1928), Victorian English illustrator